Hoogmade is a village in the Dutch province of South Holland. It is located about 7 km east of Leiden, in the municipality of Kaag en Braassem.

History 
The village was first mentioned between 1280 and 1287 as "Hoghe made", and means "elevated hay land". Hoogmade is a peat excavation settlement which developed in the Middle Ages.

The Dutch Reformed church is an aisleless church with open wooden tower built between 1729 and 1730 as a replacement of the medieval church. The Catholic Onze-Lieve-Vrouw-Geboorte church is an aisleless church with built-in tower with needle spire. It was built between 1931 and 1932 to replace the 1875 church which had collapsed. On 4 November 2019, the Onze-Lieve-Vrouw-Geboorte church was severely damaged by fire. With the help of many volunteers to raise money, three years after this fire the rebuilding of the church has started 

The polder mill Doesmolen was built around 1636. It was in service until 1953. In 1965, it was restored and functions on a voluntary basis.

Hoogmade was home to 311 people in 1840. It was a separate municipality between 1817 and 1855, when it merged with Woubrugge. In 2009, it became part of the municipality of Kaag en Braassem.

Gallery

References

Populated places in South Holland
Former municipalities of South Holland
Kaag en Braassem